GNU Mailman is a computer software application from the GNU Project for managing electronic mailing lists.
Mailman is coded primarily in Python and currently maintained by Abhilash Raj. Mailman is free software, licensed under the GNU General Public License.

History 
A very early version of Mailman was written by John Viega while a graduate student, who then lost his copy of the source in a hard drive crash sometime around 1998. Ken Manheimer at CNRI, who was looking for a replacement for Majordomo, then took over development. When Manheimer left CNRI, Barry Warsaw took over. Mailman 3—the first major new version in over a decade—was released in April 2015.

Features 
Mailman runs on most Unix-like systems, including Linux. Since Mailman 3.0 it has required python-3.4 or newer. It works with Unix-style mail servers such as Exim, Postfix, Sendmail and qmail. Features include:

 A customizable publicly-accessible web page for each maillist.
 Web application for list administration, archiving of messages, spam filtering, etc. Separate interfaces are available for users (for self-administration), moderators (to accept/reject list posts), and administrators.
 Support for multiple administrators and moderators for each list.
 Per-list privacy features, such as closed-subscriptions, private archives, private membership rosters, and sender-based posting rules.
 Integrated bounce detection and automatic handling of bouncing addresses.
 Integrated spam filters
 Majordomo-style email based commands.
 Support for virtual domains.
 List archiving. The default archiver provided with Mailman 2 is Pipermail, although other archivers can be used instead. The archiver for Mailman 3 is HyperKitty.

See also 

 List of mailing list software
 Electronic mailing list

References

Further reading

Reviews 
 Mailing List Management Made Easy

Other resources 
 List Administrator's Guide
 "Mailman – An Extensible Mailing List Manager Using Python"; Ken Manheimer, Barry Warsaw, John Viega; presented at the 7th International Python Conference, Nov 10-13, 1998
 "Mailman: The GNU Mailing List Manager"; John Viega, Barry Warsaw, Ken Manheimer; presented at the 12th Usenix Systems Administration Conference (LISA '98), Dec 9, 1998
 GNU Mailman chapter in The Architecture of Open Source Applications Volume 2
 Barry Warsaw presentation on Mailman 3 at PyCon US 2012

External links

 
 Mailman Documentation
 Mailman support mailing lists
 

GNU Project software
Free software programmed in Python
Free mailing list software
Mailing list software for Linux
1999 software